The Shroud Conspiracy, is a 2017 thriller novel by John Heubusch, focuses on the reactions of science and religion concerning Christianity’s famous relic, the Shroud of Turin.

The book's sequel, The Second Coming, was published in 2018.

Plot
Dr. Jon Bondurant is a forensic anthropologist and atheist. When the Vatican invites him to lead an investigation into the authenticity of the purported burial cloth of Jesus Christ, he agrees. After a contentious debate, the Vatican allows the examination of one of the sacred relics in order to spite the skeptical Bondurant.

While in the Vatican, Bondurant meets Domenika Josef, a devout Catholic and the Vatican’s media specialist assigned to keep an eye on him. She’s privy to something Bondurant is not -- a recently discovered ancient Codex with revelations concerning the Shroud. What she’s not privy to is her own role in a plan by forces bent on stealing DNA tied to the sacred blood-stained Shroud. The resulting attempt to clone Jesus has apocalyptic results and is the subject of Heubusch’s sequel.

Publication 
The Shroud Conspiracy was published by Simon & Schuster on March 14, 2017.

Editions 
  (hardcover, 2017)

References

External links 
 Simon & Schuster

Shroud of Turin
American thriller novels
Books about Jesus
Novels about cloning
Novels about religion
Catholicism in fiction
2017 American novels
Novels about mass media people
Simon & Schuster books
2017 debut novels